Moynihan is a surname of Irish origin.

Recorded in several spellings forms including Moynihan, Monahan, Monaghan, Monaham, Minihane, Minihan, Mournighan, and probably others, this is an Irish surname of great antiquity. It originates from the Irish language Ó Muimhneacháin, which literally translates as "male descendant of the Munsterman". The surname is most popular in Counties Cork and Kerry, which form part of the province of Munster. The modern spellings are usually Moynihan and Monaghan, the spelling in the 16th century being generally recorded as Minighane, and regarded as the principal surname of West Cork. Michael and Mortimer Moynihan were famous rebels in the late 16th century, and hailed from Skibbereen. Several of the name were famine immigrants into New York City, who embarked from Liverpool on the ship Hampden bound for that port on December 8, 1846. The first recorded spelling of the family name is shown to be that of Teag Ó Muimhneacháin, dated 1659, in the Barony of Tulla, during the reign of Richard Cromwell, Lord Protector, between 1658 and 1660. Throughout the centuries, surnames in every country have continued to "develop" often leading to astonishing variants of the original spelling.

People
Antony Moynihan, 3rd Baron Moynihan, British hereditary peer
Bobby Moynihan, American actor, comedian, and writer 
Brandon Moynihan, actor who plays Captain Obvious
Brian Moynihan, American businessman 
Colin Moynihan, 4th Baron Moynihan, British politician and rower 
Daniel Patrick Moynihan (1927–2003), American politician, sociologist, and diplomat
Donald P. Moynihan, Irish-American political scientist
 Dean Moynihan, developer of the video game One Chance
James Michael Moynihan (1932–2017), American prelate of the Roman Catholic Church
Jesse Moynihan, American artist, composer and director
Johnny Moynihan, Irish folk singer
Jon Moynihan, British businessman and venture capitalist
Maurice Moynihan, Irish economist and civil servant
Michael Moynihan (author), American author
Michael Moynihan (Cork politician) (born 1968), Irish Fianna Fáil politician 
Michael Moynihan (Kerry politician) (1917–2001), Irish Labour Party politician
Michael C. Moynihan, American journalist
Michael J. Moynihan, American musician and journalist 
P. H. Moynihan, former United States Congressman from Illinois
Rebecca Moynihan, Irish Labour Party politician
Robert Moynihan, editor of Inside the Vatican magazine
Tim Moynihan (1907–1952), American football player and coach
Timothy Moynihan (1941–2020), American politician

See also
Minihan
Monaghan (disambiguation)  
Monahan
Moynahan

References

Surnames
Anglicised Irish-language surnames
Surnames of Irish origin